Vârf (Romanian for "peak, summit, top", from Slavic vrh, vrah) may refer to:

 Vârf, a village in Năeni Commune, Buzău County, Romania
 Vârfurile, Arad, a commune in Romania
 Vârf, the Romanian name of Vrav, a village in Bulgaria